Alberto Varo Lara (born 18 March 1993) is a Spanish professional footballer who plays as a goalkeeper.

Football career
Born in Tarragona, Catalonia, Varo joined Gimnàstic de Tarragona's youth setup in 2004, aged 11. He made his debuts as a senior with the farm team in the 2012–13 campaign, in Tercera División.

On 27 February 2014, after both Manolo Reina and Tomeu Nadal were unavailable, Varo was called up to the main squad for a Segunda División B match against Valencia CF Mestalla. Three days later he made his debut, starting in the 2–2 away draw.

On 8 July 2015, after being a key defensive unit for the B-side in its promotion to the third level, Varo signed a new three-year deal with Nàstic. On 6 September, he saved a penalty and also scored the equalizer for Pobla in a 1–1 draw against CF Badalona.

On 28 February 2016, as Reina was suspended and Nadal left in the previous transfer window, Varo made his professional debut by playing the full 90 minutes in a 1–1 Segunda División away draw against Real Valladolid. On 29 June, he was loaned to FC Barcelona B for one year.

On 10 July 2018, Varo signed a two-year contract with CD Lugo. He was mainly used as a backup to Juan Carlos and Ander Cantero during his spell, and terminated his contract on 25 August 2021.

References

External links
FC Barcelona official profile

1993 births
Living people
Sportspeople from Tarragona
Spanish footballers
Footballers from Catalonia
Association football goalkeepers
Segunda División players
Segunda División B players
Tercera División players
CF Pobla de Mafumet footballers
Gimnàstic de Tarragona footballers
FC Barcelona Atlètic players
CD Lugo players